Loxa is an unincorporated community in Coles County, Illinois, United States. Loxa is located north of Illinois Route 16, halfway between Charleston and Mattoon.

The community may have been named for Loja, Granada, Spain or a shortening of Loxahatchee, Florida.

References

Unincorporated communities in Coles County, Illinois
Unincorporated communities in Illinois